Kermaran (also Romanized as Kermarān and Kermerān; also known as Kerīmnūn and Kirimun) is a village in Ruydar Rural District, Ruydar District, Khamir County, Hormozgan Province, Iran. At the 2006 census, its population was 352, in 90 families.

References 

Populated places in Khamir County